McHenry High School (MCHS) is a four-year public high school located in McHenry, Illinois, a northwestern suburb of Chicago, Illinois. It is part of McHenry Community High School District 156, which operates two separate campuses, named The Upper and The Freshman Campus. The Freshman Campus opened in 1925 and currently enrolls 9th-grade students. The Upper Campus opened in 1968 and enrolls 10th-grade through 12th-grade students. The high school serves students in the communities of McHenry, Wonder Lake, Bull Valley, Holiday Hills, McCullom Lake, and Lakemoor. The current principal for both campuses in McHenry High School is Dr. Jeff Prickett, Ed.D since 2021. The school's colors are orange and black. The school's mascot is a Warrior, and it is named Leonidas the Warrior.

History
In 1925, The McHenry High School - Freshman Campus (first opened as McHenry East High School Campus), was established as the first campus for McHenry High School District #156. The Freshman Campus housed students in 9th through 12th grade since its opening in 1925 until 1968. 

In 1968, McHenry High School Upper Campus (first opened as McHenry High School West Campus) was first opened to 11th-12th grade students to accommodate McHenry's and surrounding towns' population growth, meanwhile East Campus began to serve 9th and 10th graders. This arrangement continued until Johnsburg High School was opened in 1979.

In 1979, with the departure of Johnsburg High School students, the McHenry High School district restructured grade levels between both campuses, with both East and West Campuses eventually becoming 4-year high schools, after The East Campus building underwent significant remodeling. Despite two separate campuses, they both operated under McHenry High School to keep the one Warrior identity and spirit between both campuses. After the grade level restructures, both campuses housed 9th-12th grade students from different parts of the City of McHenry and surrounding towns within the school district's boundaries.

Through the 1980s and 1990s, the schools grew to capacity as McHenry County was one of the fastest-growing counties in the United States during the population boom of the 1990s. After several failed referendums attempts during the 1990s to expand the Upper Campus and improve facilities at the Freshman Campus, a referendum was finally approved in 2000. Construction began in 2000 and was finished in 2003 with the additions of a new gym, cafeteria, and staircases to the Upper Campus. The Upper Campus was expanded to have a capacity of close to 1,600, with the Freshman Campus remaining at around 950. Following the new addition opening at the Upper Campus, boundaries were then changed to reflect this added facility space. Since the completion of the 2003 expansion of the Upper Campus, inequities between the Upper Campus and Freshman Campus have been growing. The Upper Campus had more space and opportunities for students to excel than the Freshman Campus.

During the 2010s, the McHenry High School district has developed over 20 Advanced Placement courses and a variety of dynamic, 21st-century electives. In a statement from the school district in 2018, "As our curriculum offerings become more modern and advanced, East [Freshman] Campus students have increasingly been forced to travel to West [Upper] Campus or select other opportunities. About a quarter of all MCHS students travel, and about 23% of teachers. The vast majority of East [Freshman] Campus students have to travel at some point during high school and many find themselves attending multiple classes at West [Upper] Campus during the school day." As these inequities began to grow between West and East, district officials approved a $44 million referendum  to be shown on the ballot to voters, and ask voters whether they would approve or reject the addition of a new Science, Technology and Industry Center at the McHenry High School Upper Campus, and building improvements in both campuses. In 2018, the referendum was approved by voters,  construction started in 2019 and was completed in the summer of 2021.

In 2021, with the new addition at the Upper Campus, and the grade restructuring between both campuses, it is the first and only high school in McHenry County that holds a dedicated Science, Technology, and Industry Center. The McHenry High School Upper Campus building and the parking lot was vastly expanded to accommodate 10th through 12th grade students coming from the Freshman Campus (East Campus). Fluorescent lightning was replaced by energy efficient LED lights in classrooms, new furniture was added such as chairs, tables, for the commons areas, an expansion of tennis courts, and safety projects such as the BluePoint system that could be activated by anyone that would alert local police of an emergency situation in the high school.

Academics 

McHenry High School offers over 30 Advanced Placement courses and dual credit pathways. The AP® participation rate at McHenry High School-Upper Campus is 45%. The high school also holds a 70,000 square foot State-of-the-Art Center for Science, Technology, and Industry Center for courses in biology, computer science, manufacturing such as a t-shirt print shop, automotive course, technology rooms for robotics, applied engineering, and computer sciences, e-Sports, classrooms dedicated to biology and medical studies, and new journalism classrooms. McHenry High School is ranked 195 out of 724 in high school academics within Illinois, according to US News based on data from the 2018–2021 school years.

Student Body 

In the school year 2021-2022, McHenry High School enrolled a total of 2,185 students.

Racial Makeup
In 2021-2022, McHenry High School enrolled 73.2% of White students, 1.2% of Black students, 23.4% of Hispanic students, 1.4% of Asian students, 0% of Native Hawaiian/Pacific Islander, and 0.5% of students with two or more races.

Enrollments by Grade
In 2021-2022, McHenry High School enrolled 550 students in 9th grade, 541 students in 10th grade, 551 students in 11th, and 541 students in 12th grade.

Extracurriculars and Clubs

Warrior Activities
McHenry High School offers several extracurriculars to students. Many of these clubs have an advisor, who also teach academic materials at the high school. McHenry High School names their extracurriculars and clubs as Warrior Activities. The following activities are offered at McHenry High School:

Academic Team/Scholastic Bowl
The Academic Team/Scholastic Bowl club is a competitive academic club where McHenry High School students compete against other area schools under the IHSA Tournament series. Students compete in matches that involve answering questions in a variety of subjects, which include government, history, art, literature,  and math.

Art Club
The Art Club is an extracurricular where McHenry High School students meet after a regular school day to create or discuss artistic material.

Automotive Club
Automotive Club is an automotive intensive club where McHenry High School students perform work on projects involving passenger vehicles. The Automotive Club at McHenry High School competes in two annual auto competitions.

Bass Fishing Club
Bass Fishing Club is a competitive, IHSA sanctioned, fishing club offered to McHenry High School students.

Black Student Union
Black Student Union is a club offered at McHenry High School, where students explore and discuss African American culture and history.

Book Club
Book Club is a club offered at McHenry High School, where students discuss books that they are currently reading. Often, students who enjoy reading participate in the club, and discuss particular topics based from the book that they're reading.

Chess Club/Team
The Chess Team at McHenry High School is a competitive, ISHA sanctioned, team where students compete with other schools in chess games.

Color Guard/Winter Guard
Color Guard/Winter Guard is an activity offered to McHenry High School students, where they perform dances while using flags, rifles, and sabres. Students involved in Color Guard/Winter Guard also perform during football games along with the Marching Band. The Color Guard/Winter Guard also perform their own show to the high school in the winter season, typically in December.

Comic Book/Manga/Fandoms Club
Comic Book/Manga/Fandoms Club is a club, where McHenry High School students discuss, share comic books, films, novels. Students also discuss anime and manga related content, including current events.

Connections Crew
The Connections Crew Club is a club composed of McHenry High School Upper Campus students (11th-12th grade) who meet with Sophomore students who have transitioned from the Freshman Campus. Students involved with the Connections Crew, meet with groups of Sophomore students under team building activities.

Cyber Security Club
Cyber Security Club is offered by the McHenry High School to students, where students learn technology skills and compete in teams to solve cyber security issues presented to them.

Drama and Thespian Society Club
The Drama and Thespian Club, or simply known as Drama Club, is offered to students who are interested with theatrical stage performances. The program has existed at McHenry High School since 1951.

Environmental Club
The Environmental Club is a club offered at McHenry High School, where students meet to discuss environmental topics, and collect recycling containers from the Upper Campus building and the Freshman Campus building. Additionally, the Environmental Club is a sponsor of the Adopt-a-Highway program in Illinois, where they collect waste from Walkup Road, which is a road located in Crystal Lake, Illinois, south of the Upper Campus building located in McHenry, Illinois.

eSports
eSports is a club offered at McHenry High School, where students are involved in competitive and non-competitive video game matches against other high schools in the area. Students compete in teams or individually and matches follow a structure similar to national professional eSports tournaments.

Gender & Sexuality Alliance
Gender & Sexuality Alliance, also known as GSA, is a club offered at McHenry High School to students, where they discuss topics surrounding the LGBT community.

Latin American Student Organization
Latin American Student Organization, also known as LASO, is a club offered at McHenry High School, where students meet to discuss topics surrounding Latin-American students. Students involved in LASO, also explore secondary education options and create long-term goals for themselves. LASO also provides community service events, such as orientations, bilingual parent advisory meetings to McHenry High School.

Marching Band
The Marching Band is composed of students who enjoy playing instruments, and perform at all home football games, and select parades in the communities that McHenry High School serves.

Math Team
The Math Team is composed of students who enjoy Mathematics, and the team competes in the Fox Valley Conference.

McHenry Activism Club
The McHenry Activism Club (MAC) is composed of students who enjoy to discuss, and raise awareness of local, state, and national issues.

Symphonic Band
Under the direction of Spencer Hile, The McHenry High School Symphonic Band performed at the 2019 SuperState Festival at the University of Illinois Urbana-Champaign. The McHenry High School Symphonic Band was also accepted to perform at the 2020 All-State Festival in Peoria, Illinois. Both festivals featured the top high school symphonic bands in the state of Illinois. Most notably, the McHenry High School Symphonic Band was accepted as a featured band at the 2020 Music for All National Festival in Indianapolis, Indiana, as one of the nation's top 16 high school bands. Unfortunately, the 2020 All-State Festival was canceled due to the COVID-19 pandemic. Their choir, "Surround Sound," was invited to sing for Eric Whitacre in New York City at Carnegie Hall in November 2020, however, the performance was also canceled due to the COVID-19 pandemic. The recent festival acceptances were the firsts in the school's history.

The McHenry Messenger
The McHenry Messenger, launched in the Winter of 2019, is McHenry High School's student-run newspaper. It has received various recognitions from the Illinois Journalism Education Association (IJEA). In its first year of operation, during the school year of 2019–2020, it has received the Best Website, 3rd Best Hybrid Publication, and an All-State Journalism Team recognitions.

Key Club
"Key Club is the oldest and largest service program for high school students. It is a student-led organization that teaches leadership through service to others. Members of the Kiwanis International family, Key Club members build themselves as they build their schools and communities. Key Club has approximately 260,000 members in approximately 5,000 clubs. Key Club is represented in 37 countries” according to the McHenry Key Club website.
In the Spring of 2021, officers with the Upper Campus Key Club attended the first Key Club Digital District Convention and Leadership Conference due to the COVID-19 pandemic and received several awards. The McHenry Key Club received 1st place in the platinum division for the James Robert Hall Achievement Award. The club also received the RIOT Award, the Newsletter Award, and the Technology Award. The Advisor Emma Theel said she is proud of how club members adapted to ever-changing conditions during the last year. Theel said the Upper Campus club, one of the largest, was mentioned several times for the efforts to continue to serve during a global pandemic in 2020 and 2021.

Yearbook
The Warrior, McHenry High School's yearbook, has received several recognitions from Illinois Journalism Education Association (IJEA). In 2017, The Warrior yearbook has received first place in Division 5. Since 2018, McHenry High School is considered a division 6 school, due to an increased enrollment of students that surpassed over 2,100. In 2018, under Division 6, The Warrior Yearbook has received second place in overall general excellence. However, in 2019, The Warrior only received honorable mentions. In 2020, despite a turbulent end of the 2019–2020 academic school year due to the COVID-19 pandemic, The Warrior received third place in overall excellence.

Broadcast
Broadcast, a journalism-heavy course launched in 2022, offers McHenry High School students opportunities to excel in journalism and social media. Students produce weekly shows known as the 'Warrior Weekly' in their dedicated Broadcast studio to provide updates to students, teachers, and community members of the school's community. In addition, they create Podcasts and collaborate with the school's newspaper, The McHenry Messenger, to create in-depth news stories that pertain to the school's community. In February 2022, the Broadcast program received recognition from Fox 32 (WFLD 32), a local television station in the Chicago Metropolitan area, for being entirely student-run.

Athletics

Athletic Teams and Memberships 
McHenry High School is a member of the Fox Valley Conference (FVC) and Illinois High School Association (IHSA). McHenry High School currently offers the following athletic teams:

Athletic Achievements

The table below depicts the highest achievements that McHenry High School athletic teams have earned. These achievements only include achievements associated with the Illinois High School Association (IHSA) in teams, not individuals.

Notable alumni 
Please note: Prior to the Class of 2021, the Upper Campus (West Campus) and the Freshman Campus (East Campus) separately held their own respective class graduation ceremonies. Since the Class of 2022, East and West seniors merged and graduate at the Upper Campus.

Upper Campus Notable Alumni 
None

West Campus Alumni
 Matt Skiba (Class of 1994) – lead singer of Alkaline Trio and Blink-182.
 Jason Faunt (Class of 1992) – actor best known for Wesley Collins on Power Rangers Time Force
Ryan Sierakowski (Class of 2015) – professional MLS player (Portland Timbers)
Bobby Miller (Class of 2017) – professional MLB pitcher (Los Angeles Dodgers)

East Campus Alumni
 Chuck Hiller (Class of 1952) – former MLB player (San Francisco Giants, New York Mets, Philadelphia Phillies, Pittsburgh Pirates)
Gary Adams (Class of 1961) – founder of TaylorMade Golf Company.
Robert Tonyan (Class of 2012) – professional American football player for the Green Bay Packers.

References

External links 

Public high schools in Illinois
Schools in McHenry County, Illinois
McHenry, Illinois